Hypolycaena scintillans, the scintillating fairy hairstreak , is a butterfly in the family Lycaenidae. It was described by Henri Stempffer in 1957. It is found in Guinea, Sierra Leone, Liberia, Ivory Coast, Ghana, Nigeria and western Cameroon. The habitat consists of primary and secondary forests.

References

External links
Bold images

Butterflies described in 1957
Hypolycaenini